Compton Acres is a housing development located to the south west of West Bridgford, Nottinghamshire, England, on the rural-urban fringe. Compton Acres also borders with the villages of Ruddington and Wilford.  Most of the estate was built in the 1990s.

The name Compton Acres is taken from a garden in Poole, Dorset. Many of the streets are named after areas in Dorset, or trees.

The architecture of the area is typical for houses of its age, mostly being neo-Tudor or neo-Victorian. The district centre is Compton Acres Shopping Centre, which has a variety of general stores including a small Tesco supermarket and several restaurants. Further up Compton Acres is The Apple Tree pub. There were plans for a large Sainsbury's superstore on the site of the old Chateau public house, between The Becket School and the "Roko" gym, but these have been scrapped and the land sold to the supermarket chain Lidl. On this site there is now a large car park with a Lidl, PureGym, Indigo Sun (tanning salon), Starbucks and a fish and chip shop; this was opened on 24th February 2022. Linden Homes have built 170 new houses on a floodplain between "Roko" and the new Rushcliffe Arena on an area of brownfield land, the site of a former waste tip.

The Nottingham Emmanuel School and The Becket School are two secondary schools located in Compton Acres, which both opened in 2008/2009.

The Nottingham Express Transit (tram system) runs along the disused railway line, and opened in 2015. Compton Acres has its own tram stop.

Compton Acres is itself a ward (click here for map) within the borough of Rushcliffe. Part of Compton Acres lies within the Lutterell Ward (click here for map).

The area is a popular residential location for commuters into the centre of Nottingham, approximately three miles away on the north bank of the River Trent, although about 9% of workers are based at home in a growing segment of self-employed workers.

History
Before construction of the estate, the area was mainly marshland punctuated with willow trees, many of which have been incorporated into the leafy feel of the area. In the estate there are open greens, parks and tree lined paths. A proportion of the estate to the east sits on a former waste tip. There are ponds scattered across the area where many families go to feed the ducks.

Architecture and housing

Neighbouring Neighbourhoods 
Abbey Park
Wilford
Wilford Hill
Silverdale

References

External links
 Nottingham City Transport No. 8, 9 and 10 buses serve Compton Acres
 The Nottingham Emmanuel School
 The Becket School
 Greythorn Primary School
 The Apple Tree pub
 Roko Health Club Nottingham
 Compton Acres Opticians

West Bridgford